Blake School may refer to:
 The Blake School (Minneapolis)
 Blake School (Plantation, Florida)
 Blake School (Lake City, Florida)